The Yamaha YZM500 was a Motocross bike.
...
Jackie Vimond won the 500cc Sweden GP overall in 1988 using this bike. This bike was originally engineered for 1983 500cc world champion Hakan Carlqvist, but he was fired by Yamaha at the end of 1986 after having modified his 1986 works bike without his teams authorization (forks change). So he never could race this bike.

Yamaha used the general look of this works bike to design the 1988 YZ 250 production motocross bike, but did not use the aluminium frame on any bike before 2005.

References

Two-stroke motorcycles
Yamaha motorcycles